The Committee of Privileges (Malay: Jawatankuasa Hak dan Kebebasan; ; Tamil: மலேசிய மன்றத்தின் பிரபுக்களின் பிரகடனம் குழு) is a select committee of the Senate in the Parliament of Malaysia that considers any matter which appears to affect the powers and privileges of the Senate and issues a statement regarding the matter to the Senate.

Membership

14th Parliament
As of April 2019, the members of the committee are as follows:

See also
Parliamentary Committees of Malaysia

References

External links
COMMITTEE OF PRIVILEGES - SENATE

Parliament of Malaysia
Committees of the Parliament of Malaysia
Committees of the Dewan Negara